Haizea ('Wind') was a Basque band, playing psychedelic rock, progressive rock and folk-rock. Haizea released two albums, Haizea and Hontz Gaua. The first album Haizea was released in 1977 (IOIOTS-149 LS), being more folk than progressive. The second album, Hontz gaua (XOXOA 111 03) was released in 1979, as psychedelic folk.

The band's line up was originally Xabier Lasa (guitar and voice) (later Txomin Artola); C. Busto (drums, percussion and xilophon) (later C. Busto Hondar); Xabier Iriondo (flute and guitar); Gabriel Berrena (contrabass and electric bass); and Amaia Zubiria (vocals).

Haizea album
The album Haizea contains the following tracks:
 Brodatzen ari nintzen
 Urzo aphal bat
 Loa loa
 Goizeko euri artean
 Uxa ixuririk
 Oreina bila
 Arrosa xuriaren azpian

Hontz gaua
The album Hontz gaua contains the following tracks:
 Anderea
 Egunaren Hastapena
 Argizagi ederra
 Arnaki
 Hontz Gaua

References

Spanish progressive rock groups
Basque music bands